An ethics committee is a body that oversees the conduct of medical research and other human experimentation.

Ethics committee may also refer to:

Canadian House of Commons Standing Committee on Access to Information, Privacy and Ethics
Ethics committee (European Union)
Federal Ethics Committee on Non-Human Biotechnology (Switzerland)
FIFA Ethics Committee
 Institutional review board (US ethics committee)
United States House Committee on Ethics (popularly known as the Ethics Committee)
United States Senate Select Committee on Ethics

See also 
 Ethics commission